Futebol Clube de Oliveira do Hospital is a professional Portuguese football and futsal club based in Oliveira do Hospital, Coimbra. Founded in 1938, it currently plays in the Campeonato de Portugal which is the Portuguese third tier, holding home matches at Estádio Municipal de Oliveira do Hospital, which holds 5,000 spectators.

Appearances

Football
Tier 3: 11
Tier 4: 12

League and Cup history

Football

Futsal

Men's competition

2006–07: 7th (AF Coimbra)
2007–08: 1st (AF Coimbra)
2008–09: 8th (AF Coimbra)

Chairmen
 Rui Monteiro
 Paulo Figueira
 Mário Brito

External links
Official website 
Zerozero team profile

 
Association football clubs established in 1938
Football clubs in Portugal
1938 establishments in Portugal